The wine regions of South Africa were defined under the "Wine of Origin" (Wyn van Oorsprong) act of 1973. Mirroring the French Appellation d'origine contrôlée (AOC) system, all South African wines listing a "Wine of Origin" must be composed entirely of grapes from its region. The "Wine of Origins" (WO) program mandates how wine regions of South Africa are defined and can appear on wine labels. While some aspects of the WO are taken from the AOC, the WO is primarily concerned with accuracy in labeling. As a result, the WO does not place adjunct regulations on wine regions such as delineating permitted varieties, trellising methods, irrigation techniques, and crop yields.

The WO system divides growing regions into four categories. The largest and most generic are Geographical Units (such as the Western Cape region) which subsume the smaller, but still broad spanning Regions (such as Cape South Coast). Under these are clustered districts (like Walker Bay) and within them are wards (such as Elgin). Although these are geographic units, regions and districts are largely traced by political boundaries (wards are the segment most defined by unique, Terroir characteristics).

Summary table

Geographical units
Western Cape - A large multi-regional designation covering every appellation except those in the Northern Cape.
KwaZulu-Natal - The whole Province was designated as a Geographical Unit in August 2005. 
Eastern Cape - The Eastern Cape Province was designated South Africa’s newest wine region in 2009.
Limpopo
Northern Cape

Regions
Western Cape
Boberg - For use in respect of fortified wines from Paarl, Franschhoek and Tulbagh.
Breede River Valley - contains three wine districts and fifteen wards.
Cape South Coast - contains five districts and 15 wards.
Coastal Region - contains eight districts and seventeen wards.
Klein Karoo - contains two districts and five wards.
Olifants River - contains three districts and five wards.

Northern Cape
Northern Cape - contains two districts and three wards.

Eastern Cape
Eastern Cape - contains no districts and one ward.

Districts
Boberg - Paarl, Franschhoek and Tulbagh
Breede River Valley - Breedekloof, Robertson, and Worcester
Cape South Coast - Cape Agulhas, Overberg, Plettenberg Bay, Swellendam and Walker Bay 
Coastal Region - Cape Peninsula, Darling, Franschhoek/Franschhoek Valley, Paarl, Stellenbosch, Swartland, Tulbagh, Tygerberg and Wellington
Klein Karoo - Calitzdorp and Langeberg-Garcia
Olifants River - Citrusdal Mountain, Citrusdal Valley and Lutzville Valley
Northern Cape - Douglas and Sutherland-Karoo,

Wards

Western Cape:
Breedekloof district of the Breede River Valley - Goudini and Slanghoek
Robertson district of the Breede River Valley - Agterkliphoogte, Bonnievale, Boesmansrivier, Eilandia, Hoopsrivier, Klaasvoogds, Le Chasseur, McGregor and Vinkrivier
Worcester district of the Breede River Valley - Aan-de-Doorns, Hex River Valley, Nuy and Scherpenheuvel
Cape Agulhas district of the Cape South Coast - Elim
Overberg district of the Cape South Coast - Elgin, Greyton, Klein River and Theewater
Swellendam district of the Cape South Coast - Buffeljags, Malgas and Stormsvlei
Walker Bay district of the Cape South Coast - Bot River, Hemel-en-Aarde Ridge, Hemel-en-Aarde Valley, Sunday's Glen, Upper Hemel-en-Aarde Valley
Other wards from the Cape South Coast - Herbertsdale and Stilbaai East
Darling district of the Coastal Region - Groenekloof
Paarl district of the Coastal Region - Simonsberg-Paarl, Voor Paardeberg, and Wellington
Stellenbosch district of the Coastal Region - Banghoek, Bottelary, Devon Valley, Jonkershoek Valley, Papegaaiberg, Polkadraai Hills and Simonsberg-Stellenbosch
Swartland district of the Coastal Region - Malmesbury and Riebeekberg
Tygerberg district of the Coastal Region - Durbanville and Philadelphia
Other wards in the Coastal Region - Constantia and Hout Bay
Other wards in the Klein Karoo Region - Montagu, Tradouw, Tradouw Highlands, Outeniqua and Upper Langkloof
Citrusdal Mountain district of the Olifants River region - Piekenierskloof 
Lutzville Valley district of the Olifants River region - Koekenaap
Other wards in the Olifants River Region - Bamboes Bay, Spruitdrift, Vredendal, Cederberg, Ceres, Lamberts Bay, Prince Albert Valley and Swartberg

Northern Cape:
Wards of the Northern Cape - Hartswater, Central Orange River and Rietrivier FS

Eastern Cape:
Wards of the Eastern Cape - St Francis Bay

See also
 List of wineries in South Africa
 History of South African wine
 South African wine

References